Garnik Serobi Asatrian (born March 7, 1953) is an Iranian-born Armenian professor who studies and teaches Kurdish culture at Yerevan State University in Yerevan, Armenia.

Asatrian became well-known for his extensive research in the field of the study of Kurdish tribal and linguistic tradition and also for the establishment of the Center of Contemporary Kurdish Studies.

Biography 
Asatrian was born on March 7, 1953, in Tehran, and immigrated to Yerevan in 1968. In 1976, he graduated from the Department of Kurdish Studies at the Iranian Studies Branch of Yerevan State University.

From 1977 to 1986, he was a PhD student and then a senior lecturer at the Institute of Oriental Studies, Academy of Soviet Sciences in Leningrad in the field of ancient Iranian culture and languages (Avestan, Sogdian, Pahlavi, Persian, Kurdish, and Iranian ethnology). Asatrian earned a doctorate from the University of Leningrad in 1984 and an excellent doctorate in 1990 from the Soviet Academy of Sciences in Moscow.

He has drawn together 11 books and more than 125 scientific articles in Armenian, Russian, English, German, French, Turkish, and Kurdish languages. From 1985–1999 he was a professor at the University of Copenhagen and participated in various international conferences in Berlin, Moscow, Copenhagen, Oslo, Aarhus, New York, London, Washington, Tehran, and Paris.

One of the best and effective works of Asatrian is "The Cultural Dictionary of Persian Etymology", which is written in Persian and contains all the original Iranian words with transcription. He is the founder of two magazines, Irannameh (A newspaper published in the USA in Persian language) and Acta Kurdica.

Views and criticism 
In a 1998 interview with Onnik Krikorian, Asatrian claimed that no Kurdish nation existed due to the linguistic and religious diversity among them. He moreover claimed that no discrimination of Muslim Kurds and Yazidis existed in Armenia which contradicts the findings of a United States Department of State report from the same year based on the complaints of Yazidi leaders. 

Researcher and expert on Yazidis, Artur Rodziewicz, argued that it was difficult to not consider the divergent opinion of Asatrian on Kurds, Yazidis and the relationship between the two groups as politically motivated arising from 'the Armenians' attitude towards... Kurds.'

In an interview with Golos Armenii in December 2006, Asatrian stated that:

He reiterated this belief to Golos Armenii in November 2009 and further stated that: "Our [Armenian] society and some political circles clearly underestimate the role of the Kurdish factor in the past and its danger in the future."

Works 
 Prolegomena to the Study of the Kurds, by Garnik Asatrian. This article appeared in the journal Iran and the Caucasus 13(2009), pp. 1–58.
 The Origins of the Kurds and the Early Kurdish-Armenian Contacts, by Garnik Asatrian, from Iran and the Caucasus, Vol. 5 (2001), pp. 41–74, in 35 pdf pages.
 The Origins of the Kurds and Early Armenian-Kurdish Contacts, from Iran and the Caucasus, Vol. 1 (1997), pp. 1–16
 Encyclopaedia Iranica: Dimli (or Zaza), by Garnik Asatrian
 Malak-Tāwūs: The Peacock Angel of the Yezidis, by Garnik Asatrian and Victoria Arakelova, in 37 pdf pages. From Iran and the Caucasus, Vol. 7, No. 1/2 (2003), pp. 1–36.
 The Yezidi Pantheon, by Garnik Asatrian and Victoria Arakelova, in 50 pdf pages. From Iran and the Caucasus, Vol. 8, No. 2 (2004), pp. 231–279.
 The Holy Brotherhood: The Yezidi Religious Institution of the 'Brother and the Sister of the Next World', by Garnik Asatrian. From Iran and the Caucasus, Vol. 3/4 (1999/2000), pp. 79–96
 The Foremother of the Yezidis, from Religious Texts in Iranian Languages, Symposium held in Copenhagen May 2002, published 2007, pp. 323–328
 Introduction to the History and Culture of the Talish People, edited by Garnik Asatrian (Erevan, 2011)
 On the South Caspian Contact Zone: Some Talishi Folk Beliefs, by Garnik Asatrian and Victoria Arakelova, from Iran and the Caucasus 18 (2014) pp. 135–146
 Armenian Tracing Back an Old Animal-Breeding Custom in Ancient Armenia, from Iran and the Caucasus, Vol. 2 (1998), pp. 63–65
 "The Mothers of Night": An Armenian - East Iranian Parallel, by Garnik Asatrian and Tork Dalalian, from Iran and the Caucasus, Vol. 3/4 (1999/2000), pp. 171–172
 Iranian Miscellanea, from Iran and the Caucasus, Vol. 3/4 (1999/2000), pp. 203–208
 The Origin of the -ng Suffix in Kurmandji, from Iran and the Caucasus, Vol. 3/4 (1999/2000), pp. 213–214
 A Manual of Iranian Folk Magic in the Archive of the Caucasian Centre for Iranian Studies in Yerevan, by Garnik Asatrian and Victoria Arakelova, from Iran and the Caucasus, Vol. 3/4 (1999/2000), pp. 239–242
 Āl Reconsidered, from Iran and the Caucasus, Vol. 5 (2001), pp. 149–156
 Blunt, Bald and Wise: Iranian kund (-), by Garnik Asatrian and Victoria Arakelova, from Iran and the Caucasus, Vol. 5 (2001), pp. 201–206
 The Lord of Cattle in Gilan, from Iran and the Caucasus, Vol. 6, No. 1/2 (2002), pp. 75–85.
 Kurdish Lō-lō, from Iran and the Caucasus 10(2006).
 Iranian Notes III, from Iran and the Caucasus 13 (2009), pp. 319–330
 Some Notes on the Ethnic Composition of the Islamic Republic of Iran, from Farhang-e mardom (Tehran, 2011), pp. 10–26
 Marginal Remarks on the History of Some Persian Words, from Iran and the Caucasus 16 (2012), pp. 105–116, in 12 pdf pages. Twenty Persian words are examined, for: mandrake; excrement; types of prostitutes; lord; spear; thigh; crippled; slack; fenugreek; a kind of stew; types of baldness; frog; head; a water plant; first-born child; a medical herb.
 The Festival of Throwing Stones, from Iran and the Caucasus 16 (2012) pp. 201–203.
 The Ethnic Composition of Iran: From the "Expanse of the Aryans" to the Myth of Azerbaijan, Yerevan Series for Oriental Studies, vol. 2, edited by Garnik S. Asatrian (Erevan, 2012)
 Armenian Demonology: A Critical Overview, from Iran and the Caucasus 17 (2013) pp. 9–25
 'Nose' in Armenian, from Iran and the Caucasus 18 (2014), pp. 147–152
 Origine du système consonantique de la langue kurde, by Garnik Asatrian and Vladimir Livshits, from Acta Kurdica 1(1994), pp. 81–108
 A Comparative Vocabulary of Central Iranian Dialects, with notes on dialectology and local toponymy, and a grammatical essay by Garnik S. Asatrian (Teheran, 2011).
 (with F. Vahman) Poetry of the Baxtiārīs: Love Poems, Wedding Songs, Lullabies, Laments, Copenhagen, 1995.

References

External Links 
 Garnik Asatrian's biography

1953 births
Living people
Academic staff of Yerevan State University
People from Tehran
Iranian people of Armenian descent
Linguists from Iran
Iranian emigrants to the Soviet Union
Armenian lexicographers
Iranian lexicographers
Linguists of Iranian languages
Linguists of Persian
Iranologists
Kurdologists